Thado Minsaw (20 May 1531 – May 1584) was viceroy of Ava (Inwa) from 1555 to 1584 during the reigns of kings Bayinnaung and Nanda of Toungoo Dynasty of Burma (Myanmar). He fought alongside his brothers Bayinnaung, Minye Sithu, Thado Dhamma Yaza II and Minkhaung II, and his nephew Nanda in nearly every campaign from the 1550s to 1570s that rebuilt, expanded and defended the Toungoo Empire. Two years after Bayinnaung's death, he raised the first serious rebellion against the rule of Nanda. Although his rebellion was defeated in April 1584, it had set in motion more rebellions elsewhere that ultimately led to the collapse of the empire in the next 15 years.

Early life
He was born on 20 May 1531 in the Toungoo Palace precincts to Mingyi Swe and the younger sister of Shin Myo Myat. His father was a father-in-law of King Tabinshwehti and one of the king's childhood servants. He was the youngest of Swe's seven children; his siblings were much older than him. He had an elder half-sister Dhamma Dewi, a principal queen of the king; three half-brothers Bayinnaung, Minye Sithu and Thado Dhamma Yaza II; and a full elder brother Minkhaung II. His birth name is unclear. The chronicles inconsistently report the name Zeya Nanda as the name of the men who became Minkhaung II and Thado Minsaw in different parts.

He grew up during a period in which Tabinshwehti, with the help of his brothers, was waging wars against his neighbors on his way to founding the Toungoo Empire. Like his brothers, he probably received a military-style education at the palace. Though he most probably joined his brothers in Tabinshwehti's last campaigns in the late 1540s, he had not gained a regimental commander rank, and thus is not mentioned in the chronicles.

Career
His chance to shine came after Tabinshwehti was assassinated on 30 April 1550. Every major viceroy and governor declared himself independent, and did not submit to Tabinshwehti's chosen successor Bayinnaung. His own brother Minkhaung II declared himself king of Toungoo (Taungoo). Like his other brothers, he sided with Bayinnaung. In September 1550, the 19-year-old was given command of a regiment, which took part in Bayinnaung's assault on Toungoo. In January 1551, Minkhaung II surrendered and was pardoned by Bayinnaung. Thado Minsaw was given a royal title of Minye Kyawhtin on the same day. He again commanded a regiment in the Prome campaign (1551).

Thado Minsaw was one of the four deputies of Bayinnaung in the king's campaigns between 1552 and 1565 that greatly expanded the Toungoo Empire. The original four were Bayinnaung's four brothers: Minye Sithu, Thado Dhamma Yaza, Minkhaung and Thado Minsaw. After Minye Sithu's death in 1556, Bayinnaung's eldest son Nanda took his place. Bayinnaung was impressed with his younger half-brother. The king appointed him viceroy of Ava on 19 February 1555 with the style of Thado Minsaw.

The following is a list of campaigns in which Thado Minsaw participated during the reign of Bayinnaung. Chronicles do not report his participation in Manipur (1560), Mohnyin and Mogaung (1571), Lan Xang (1572), Lan Xang (1574), Mohnyin and Mogaung (1576–1577).

He was a loyal brother. He built the Ava gate of Pegu (Bago) when the capital was rebuilt between 1565 and 1568. (Each of the twenty gates of the new capital was built by key vassal rulers.) For their loyal service, Thado Dhamma Yaza II, Minkhaung II and Thado Minsaw were all honored by their brother the king on 3 March 1580.

Rebellion against Nanda
Bayinnaung died on 10 October 1581, and was succeeded by his son Nanda. The new king faced an impossible task of maintaining an empire ruled by autonomous viceroys who were loyal to Bayinnaung, not the kingdom of Toungoo. In particular, Thado Minsaw did not respect his nephew Nanda who was four years his junior. Nanda apparently too was suspicious of Thado Minsaw's intentions. The mistrust was despite the fact that both were related to each other many times over. (Nanda was Thado Minsaw's nephew. Nanda's elder sister was Thado Minsaw's wife. Thado Minsaw's only child was married to Nanda's son and heir apparent, Mingyi Swa.) They had fought alongside each other over three decades.

At any rate, when two Chinese Shan states revolted in September/October 1582, the king appointed Thado Dhamma Yaza II of Prome and Nawrahta Minsaw of Lan Na to lead two armies to put it down. Although the majority of the troops were drawn from Upper Burma and Shan states, he did not appoint the viceroy of the province to lead the invasion.

The conspicuous slight did not go unnoticed at Ava. By June/July 1583, Thado Minsaw had waited long enough. He sent secret embassies to Prome, Toungoo and Chiang Mai to launch a simultaneous revolt against Nanda. His intention was not to seek Nanda's position but to rule Ava independently. The three viceroys sided with Nanda and secretly forwarded the news to Nanda. At Pegu, Nanda was particularly concerned that Ava had the support of the Shan states. To counter the manpower of Upper Burma, Nanda secretly ordered troops from Prome, Toungoo, Lan Na, Lan Xang and Siam during the dry season of 1583–1584. In March 1584, armies from Prome, Toungoo, Lan Na, Lan Xang and Siam marched to Ava. Nanda's army left Pegu for Ava on 25 March 1584.

At Ava, Thado Minsaw did not lose composure. He asked his loyalists from the Shan states to send help while his army tried to hold off the invading armies. On 24 April 1584, the two armies met at the outskirts of Ava. Thado Minsaw's army was inside the Tada-U fort while the invading armies led by Nanda were at Pinya. Faced with an overwhelming force, Thado Minsaw issued a challenge to Nanda to fight each other on their war elephants. Nanda accepted. The two then fought in a long drawn out battle to the point where both their elephants became tired. No one dared to intervene. Finally, Thado Minsaw's elephant backed away while Nanda jumped on a fresh elephant to continue the battle. Thado Minsaw chose not to fight anymore. He and 2000 of his men fled to their fort near Mandalay Hill. From there they trekked to northern hills with a plan to seek help from China. He died en route at Hkamti.

Aftermath
Thado Minsaw's rebellion was to have a more lasting impact, however. The Siamese army, led by Naresuan, never marched to Ava as ordered, and hung around Pegu waiting for the news. When Ava was defeated, the Siamese army retreated to Martaban (Mottama) and declared independence on 3 May 1584. The ensuing unsuccessful campaigns against Siam ultimately led to the downfall of the empire in the next 15 years.

Family
His chief queen was Inwa Mibaya, the eldest daughter of Bayinnaung. He married his niece at his coronation ceremony at Ava in February 1555. The couple had just one child Natshin Medaw. He had no other children. Natshin Medaw was the chief queen of Mingyi Swa, the heir-apparent of Nanda.

Notes

References

Bibliography
 
 
 
 
 
 
 

First Toungoo Empire
1531 births
1584 deaths